William Henry Vane, 1st Duke of Cleveland, KG (27 July 1766 – 29 January 1842), styled Viscount Barnard until 1792 and known as The Earl of Darlington between 1792 and 1827 and as The Marquess of Cleveland between 1827 and 1833, was a British landowner, slave holder and politician.

Background and education
Styled Viscount Barnard from birth, he was the son of Henry Vane, 2nd Earl of Darlington, son of Henry Vane, 1st Earl of Darlington and Lady Grace FitzRoy, daughter of Charles FitzRoy, 2nd Duke of Cleveland, son of King Charles II by his mistress Barbara Palmer, 1st Duchess of Cleveland. His mother was Margaret Lowther, daughter of Robert Lowther, Governor of Barbados, and sister of James Lowther, 1st Earl of Lonsdale. He was baptised at the Chapel Royal at St James's Palace (with the names William Harry which he later changed to William Henry). He was educated at Christ Church, Oxford.

Public life
Barnard was Whig Member of Parliament for Totnes from 1788 to 1790 and for Winchelsea from 1790 to 1792. The latter year he succeeded his father in the earldom and took his seat in the House of Lords. He also succeeded his father as Lord Lieutenant of County Durham, a post he held until his death. In 1794 he was announced as the Lieutenant-colonel of a regiment to be raised, the Durham Regiment of Fencible Cavalry. In 1810 he successfully laid claim to the Pulteney Estate in Bath after the Countess of Bath died intestate in 1808. In 1827 he was created Marquess of Cleveland, a revival of the Cleveland title held by his ancestors. He was Bearer of the Third Sword at King William IV's coronation on 8 September 1831. In 1833 he was made Baron Raby, of Raby Castle in the County Palatine of Durham, and Duke of Cleveland. He was further honoured when he was made a Knight of the Garter in 1839.

His promotions through the ranks of the peerage were not uncontroversial. Greville noted in his diary on 8 September 1831:”Howe told me yesterday morning in Westminster Abbey that Lord Cleveland is to be made a duke, though it is not yet acknowledged if it is to be so. There has been a battle about that; they say that he got his boroughs to be made a marquis and got rid of them to be made a duke".

Slave holder
According to the Legacies of British Slave-Ownership at the University College London, Cleveland was awarded compensation in the aftermath of the Slavery Abolition Act 1833 with the Slave Compensation Act 1837.

Cleveland was associated with "T71/898 Barbados claim no. 3184 (Lowther)", he owned 233 slaves in Barbados and received a £4,854 payment at the time.

Family
Cleveland married his cousin, Lady Catherine Powlett (1766–1807), daughter of Harry Powlett, 6th Duke of Bolton, on 17 September 1787 at her father's seat, Hackwood Park. They had eight children:

Henry, Earl of Darlington, later 2nd Duke of Cleveland (1788–1864).
Lady Louisa Catherine Barbara Vane (1791–1821), married Major Francis Forester and had issue.
Lord William Vane, later 3rd Duke of Cleveland (1792–1864).
Lady Caroline Vane (born and died 1795).
Lady Augusta Henrietta Vane (1796–1874), married Mark Milbank and had issue, including Sir Frederick Milbank, 1st Baronet.
Lady Arabella Vane (1801–1864), married Richard Arden, 3rd Baron Alvanley.
Lord Harry Vane, later 4th Duke of Cleveland (1803–1891).
Lady Laura Vane (1807–11 November 1882), married Lieutenant-Colonel William Henry Meyrick and had issue.

After his first wife's death in London in June 1807, Cleveland married as his second wife, Elizabeth Russell (c. 1777–1861), daughter of Robert Russell, on 27 July 1813. There were no children from this marriage. Cleveland died at St James's Square, Westminster, London, in January 1842, aged 75, and was buried at Staindrop, County Durham. His eldest son Henry succeeded in the dukedom. The Duchess of Cleveland died in January 1861.

References

External links 

 

|-

1766 births
1842 deaths
Dukes of Cleveland
Knights of the Garter
Lord-Lieutenants of Durham
Barnard, William Vane, Viscount
William
British MPs 1784–1790
British MPs 1790–1796
Barons Barnard
Recipients of payments from the Slavery Abolition Act 1833
Peers of the United Kingdom created by George IV
Peers of the United Kingdom created by William IV